James ‘Paddy’ Sheridan (15 May 1882 – 1960) was an Irish footballer who played in the Football League for Everton and Stoke. He also played for the Ireland national team.

Career
Born in County Down, Sheridan had moved to Scotland with his family by the time of the 1901 United Kingdom census, when they were living in Larkhall, Lanarkshire. He played football locally for Cambuslang Hibernian before joining Everton in 1903. He spent two seasons with the Toffees and then transferred to Stoke in the summer of 1904.

Having been Everton's first Ireland international in February 1903 he claimed the same distinction for Stoke two years later, however he only scored one goal for the club (against Wolverhampton Wanderers in December 1904) and left at the end of the 1904–05 season. He then played for several clubs in northern England, Ireland and Scotland for short periods over the next eight years.

Career statistics

Club
Source:

International
Source:

References

1882 births
1960 deaths
Place of death missing
Date of death missing
Association footballers from Belfast
Irish association footballers (before 1923)
Everton F.C. players
Stoke City F.C. players
Cambuslang Hibernian F.C. players
Accrington Stanley F.C. players
Colne F.C. players
Bo'ness F.C. players
Broxburn Athletic F.C. players
Clyde F.C. players
Alloa Athletic F.C. players
Dundee United F.C. players
Port Glasgow Athletic F.C. players
Ashington A.F.C. players
English Football League players
Pre-1950 IFA international footballers
Association football forwards
Scottish Junior Football Association players
Scottish Football League players
Hamilton Academical F.C. players
Shelbourne F.C. players
Gillingham F.C. players
NIFL Premiership players